Mary Stuart (born Mary Houchins; July 4, 1926 – February 28, 2002) was an American actress, guitarist, singer, and songwriter.

A former silver screen starlet, she was perhaps best known for her starring role as Joanne on the CBS/NBC soap opera Search for Tomorrow, which she played for 35 years without interruption (1951–86). After her divorce from her first husband, with whom she raised two children, she began a side career as a guitarist and a singer-songwriter, first singing on Search for Tomorrow and then releasing her own album in 1973. At the time of her death, she had played the role of Meta Bauer on the CBS soap opera Guiding Light for six years. For her work in daytime drama, she was given the Lifetime Achievement Daytime Emmy Award.

Early years
Stuart was born in Miami, Florida, to Guy M. and Mary (née Stuart) Houchins. She grew up in Tulsa, Oklahoma, where she graduated from Tulsa Central High School and attended the University of Tulsa before embarking on her professional career. She left home at age 17 for New York City, where her career started, and where she returned after finding Hollywood too stressful. Her eventual stage name was her mother's maiden name.

Career

Film
Stuart appeared with such stars as Errol Flynn (in Adventures of Don Juan), Clark Gable (in The Hucksters), Esther Williams (in This Time for Keeps) and Henry Fonda and Lucille Ball (in The Big Street).

Television
After her film career ended,  CBS offered Stuart a role in a new undertaking that would become known as the soap opera, or daytime serial. Their first project, The First Hundred Years, was short lived. It had been canceled after just one year on the air. The executives at CBS were wary of launching a second show, but they saw a future in soaps in the person of Stuart after her screen test. It was then that they commissioned a second series. Stuart was cast as housewife Joanne Gardner. The new serial was called Search for Tomorrow and it turned out to be very successful. Stuart would become synonymous with her character. Search for Tomorrow ran for thirty-five years until 1986 when it was finally canceled. During that time her character Joanne "Jo" Gardner was widowed three times and went through many trials and tribulations. 

She was the only soap star to receive a Primetime Emmy Award nomination for performance in a series but lost to Shirley Booth. During her stint as Joanne, she and co-star Larry Haines were given special Emmy recognition for their work. Executive producer Paul Rauch offered her the role of the crooked Judge Webber on ABC's One Life to Live which she played in 1988, then settled into retirement, having worked nearly 40 years. She wrote a short story that was published in a magazine, which was eventually made into a CBS movie of the week. 

In 1996, she came out of retirement and accepted the role of Meta Bauer, Ed's aunt who became a confidante of his daughter, Michelle, on Guiding Light, a part which had been played earlier by Ellen Demming.

Music
 
Stuart collaborated with Percy Faith on an album in 1956 and with Michel Legrand in 1973. She played guitar and she penned and sang songs on Search for Tomorrow, which fit into the script as her character was an amateur singer-songwriter, and she would sing songs to convey what she was feeling, usually when she was alone. Stuart also sang and played guitar on Christmas episodes, including, but not limited to, one notable Christmas in which Stuart sang "Bring a Torch, Jeanette, Isabella" with actresses Ann Williams and Melissa Murphy, who played her sister and daughter at that time. Stuart performed at her first public concert on January 8, 1974, at Catawba College in Salisbury, North Carolina.

Personal life
Stuart married Richard Krolik in August 1951.  She gave birth to a daughter Cynthia in 1955 and a son Jeffrey in 1956. She and Krolik divorced in 1966.  She later alleged in her book, Both of Me, that Krolik was a frequently verbally abusive husband. For example, she recounted that she had secretly been writing a children's book.  When she showed the manuscript to Krolik, he threw it across the room, yelling, "How do you expect to write a book if you've never read one?"   The incident discouraged Stuart so much that she never sought out a publisher.  Her husband left New York to work at Time/Life Broadcasting in Washington, D.C. 

While Jeffrey Krolik kept his birth name, Cynthia changed hers to Cynthia Stuart.  Cynthia graduated from the North Carolina School of the Arts and became a journalist writing for the Detroit Free Press  She also followed in her mother's footsteps as an actress for a time. Cynthia is now COO of the Supportive Housing Network of New York. 

Jeffrey graduated from Dartmouth College and became a regional sales director for HBO.  He was later appointed general manager for Fox Sports Net Bay Area.
 Both of Stuart's children were raised and married in the Presbyterian Church.

Death
When she died at her home in 2002 following a stroke, it was revealed that Stuart was also suffering from gastric cancer and bone cancer. She had previously undergone an endoscopy and an operation to remove a tumor in her stomach in 1999. Stuart had battled breast cancer earlier in her life. She was survived by her widower (Wolfgang Neumann), her two children and two grandchildren.

In popular culture 
An apron Stuart wore while playing Jo on Search for Tomorrow currently hangs in the National Museum of American History at the Smithsonian in Washington, D.C.

References

External links

1926 births
2002 deaths
Actresses from Tulsa, Oklahoma
American film actresses
American Presbyterians
American soap opera actresses
American television actresses
Daytime Emmy Award winners
Deaths from bone cancer
Deaths from stomach cancer
Deaths from cancer in New York (state)
Central High School (Tulsa, Oklahoma) alumni
20th-century American actresses
20th-century American singers
Musicians from Tulsa, Oklahoma
Singer-songwriters from Oklahoma
Writers from Tulsa, Oklahoma
Writers from Miami